The thorntooth grenadier or javelin fish, Lepidorhynchus denticulatus, is a rattail, the only member of the genus Lepidorhynchus, found around southern Australia and New Zealand, at depths of between 200 and 1,000 m. Its length is between 20 and 55 cm.

References

 
 Tony Ayling & Geoffrey Cox, Collins Guide to the Sea Fishes of New Zealand,  (William Collins Publishers Ltd, Auckland, New Zealand 1982) 

Macrouridae
Fish described in 1846